The Lake Clarendon Dam is a rock and earth-fill embankment dam with an un-gated spillway located off-stream in the locality of Lake Clarendon in the Lockyer Valley Region, South East Queensland, Australia. The main purpose of the dam is for irrigation of the Lockyer Valley. The resultant impounded reservoir is called Lake Clarendon.

Location and features

The dam is managed by SEQ Water.

Completed in 1992, by mid-2006 the dam was empty due to drought conditions in Australia. In January 2011, the dam was over 80% full according to the Queensland Water Commission website.

Recreation
A Stocked Impoundment Permit is no longer required to fish in the reservoir. Lake Clarendon was removed from the SIP scheme in 2012.

See also

List of dams in Queensland

References

Clarendon
Lockyer Valley Region
Dams completed in 1992
Clarendon
Rock-filled dams
Earth-filled dams
Embankment dams
1992 establishments in Australia